Euthalia mahadeva is a butterfly of the family Nymphalidae (Limenitidinae). It is found in the Indomalayan realm.<ref>[http://ftp.funet.fi/pub/sci/bio/life/insecta/lepidoptera/ditrysia/papilionoidea/nymphalidae/limenitidinae/euthalia/ " Euthalia  " Hübner, [1819"] at Markku Savela's Lepidoptera and Some Other Life Forms</ref>

Description
Males have a dark dusky brown upperside smeared with purple on the exterior margin of the fore-wing and hind-wing with a broad band to the exterior margin, whitish anteriorly, bluish posteriorly, with a central longitudinal row of small, dusky spots. The underside is light brown, with greyish exterior margins, discoidal marks and a submarginal row of indistinct blackish spots.
SubspeciesE. m. mahadeva JavaE. m. zichri  (Butler, 1869) BorneoE. m. rhamases  Staudinger, 1889 Philippines E. m. sakii  de Nicéville, 1894 SumatraE. m. binghami  de Nicéville, 1895 Burma, ThailandE. m. sericea  Fruhstorfer, 1896 NiasE. m. zichrina''  Fruhstorfer, 1904 Peninsular Malaya

References

mahadeva
Butterflies described in 1859